Legislative Assembly elections were held in Manipur from 28 February to 5 March 2022 in two phases, to elect 60 members of the Manipur Legislative Assembly. The results declared on 10 March 2022. The newly constituted assembly was named 12th Manipur Legislative Assembly.

Background 

The tenure of Manipur Legislative Assembly is scheduled to end on 19 March 2022. The previous assembly elections were held in March 2017. After the election, coalition of Bharatiya Janata Party, National People's Party, Naga People's Front and Lok Janshakti Party formed the state government, with N. Biren Singh becoming Chief Minister.

Schedule
The election schedule was announced by the Election Commission of India on 8 January 2022. However, the election dates were postponed from 27 February to 28 February for Phase I, and 3 March to 5 March for Phase II.

Parties and alliances









Others

Candidates

Poll prediction

Opinion polls

Exit polls 

The Election Commission banned the media from publishing exit polls between 7 AM on 10 February 2022 and 6:30 PM on 7 March 2022. Violation of the directive would be punishable with two years of imprisonment. Accordingly the exit polls below were published in the evening of 7 March.

Voter turnout

Results

Results by alliance and party

Results by district

Results by constituency
Incumbent MLA's are highlighted with background color.

See also

 2022 elections in India
 Elections in Manipur

References

State Assembly elections in Manipur
2020s in Manipur
Manipur